The 1996–97 Princeton Tigers men's basketball team represented Princeton University in intercollegiate college basketball during the 1996–97 NCAA Division I men's basketball season. The head coach was Bill Carmody and the team captain was Sydney Johnson. The team played its home games in the Jadwin Gymnasium on the University campus in Princeton, New Jersey.  The team was the undefeated champion of the Ivy League, which earned them an invitation to the 64-team 1997 NCAA Division I men's basketball tournament where they were seeded twelfth in the East Region.  This was Carmody's first season taking over the coaching duties from Pete Carril who had been Princeton coach since 1967 and retired as the Ivy League's winningest coach in terms of victories and conference championships.

Using the Princeton offense, the team posted a 24–4 overall record and a 14–0 conference record. The six for six performance against Columbia stands as the only Ivy League perfect three-point shot game of six attempts or more. The team ended the regular season on a nineteen-game winning streak, which tied a school record. Nonetheless, in a March 13, 1997, NCAA Division I men's basketball tournament East Regional first round game at the Joel Coliseum in Winston-Salem, North Carolina against the fifth-seeded California Golden Bears, the team lost 55–52.

The team was led by first team All-Ivy League selections Steve Goodrich and Johnson.  Johnson earned Ivy League Men's Basketball Player of the Year. He earned the award for his defense and was the first winner with a single-digit scoring average. The team won the ninth of twelve consecutive national statistical championships in scoring defense with a 53.4 points allowed average.  Goodrich repeated as the Ivy League's field goal percentage statistical champion with a 64.8% average in conference games.

References

Princeton Tigers men's basketball seasons
Princeton Tigers
Princeton
Prince
Prince